Maseedupuram is an agricultural village located near Nandyala in Andhra Pradesh, a southern state of India.

References

Villages in Kurnool district